Abbas Qasim (born 15 January 1991) is an Iraqi footballer who played as a defender for Al-Zawraa in the Iraq Premier League, as well as the Iraq national team.

International career
On 24 July 2016, Abbas made his first international cap with Iraq against Uzbekistan in a friendly match.

Honours
Al-Zawraa
Iraqi Premier League: 2017–18
Iraq FA Cup: 2016–17, 2018–19
Iraqi Super Cup: 2017, 2021

Individual
 15/16 IPL Centre back of the season

References

External links

1991 births
Living people
Association football defenders
Iraqi footballers
Iraq international footballers
Al-Zawraa SC players